Ghosts of Our Forest is a 2017 documentary about the removal of the Batwa people by the Government of Uganda in 1992. It follows the survivors reconciling with their heritage.

Release
Ghosts of Our Forest premiered on February 20, 2017, at the Big Sky Documentary Film Festival.

Reception
P. Judkins Wellington reviewed Ghosts of Our Forest for Ethnomusicology, stating that it was "not an explicitly ethnomusicological film, but its interrelated themes of cultural preservation, human rights, and political struggle are salient to ethnomusicologists writ large." Library Journal also rated the film favorably.

References

External links
 

2017 documentary films
2017 films